Occupational epidemiology is a subdiscipline of epidemiology that focuses on investigations of workers and the workplace. Occupational epidemiologic studies examine health outcomes among workers, and their potential association with conditions in the workplace including noise, chemicals, heat, or radiation, or work organization such as schedules.

The need for evidence to inform occupational safety regulations, workers' compensation programs, and safety legislation motivated the development of public health policy, occupational epidemiology methods, and surveillance mechanisms.  Occupational epidemiological research can inform risk assessments; development of standards and other risk management activities; and estimates of the co-benefits and co-harms of policies designed to reduce risk factors or conditions that can affect human health. Occupational epidemiology methods are common to methods used in environmental epidemiology.

History 
Occupational hazards have long been recognized. For  Hippocrates recommended other physicians consider patients' vocational backgrounds when diagnosing and treating disease, and Bernardino Ramazzini in 1700 outlined many occupational ses in his book De Morbis Artificum.  There are several examples from the 19th century onwards of hazard recognition proceeding to systematic epidemiology studies.  In one example, premature mortality was reported among gold and silver miners in the Erz Mountains in Germany as early as the 16th century.  It was initially though to be the result of consumption, but it was subsequently determined to be silicosis, and studies from 1879 through the 1930s uncovered the association of miners' deaths with lung cancer and nonmalignant respiratory diseases.  Other examples include cancer among chimney sweeps, asbestos-related diseases, and the variety of occupational diseases found among factory workers in the early 1900s.

Occupational health risks were initially observed by case series reports of apparent disease excesses or clusters.  Although the case series approach provided a good indicator of occupational hazards, they are not adequate on their own to assess a wide spectrum of health outcomes that may not be closely related to workplace exposure. The development of retrospective, cohort design allowed for a more comprehensive study of the cases. Desire to improve the cost-efficiency of studies led to the use of case-control studies. Other methods later used in occupational epidemiology include cross-sectional and longitudinal studies.

Types of studies

Case series 
Typically occupational epidemiological investigations begin with the observation of an unusual number of cases of disease among a group of workers. When the investigation does not go further than what is referred to as identifying a disease cluster, the study is referred to as a case series report.

Cohort studies 
In a cohort design study, a population, or cohort, of workers is compared to a control group that was not exposed to the workplace hazards being investigated. This type of study is the most accepted in the scientific community because it most closely follows experimental strategy and observes the entire population rather than a sample. In a prospective cohort study, the group examined at the time of the study is compared to a follow up with the same group in the future. The historical cohort study design begins with defining a cohort at a time in the past and following the cohort over historical time.

Case-control studies 
Case-control studies compare the past exposure of cases with the disease to the past exposure of cases that did not have the disease. Because cohort studies require the entire population, case-control studies are a more cost-effective approach, using only the sample of workers with the disease to compare to a control.

Cross-sectional studies 
A typical cross-sectional study involves the comparison of varying degrees of exposure and the prevalence of disease, symptoms, or physiological status. The main advantage of cross-sectional studies is that they allow collection of data on conditions which would not be recorded normally because other study designs focus on severe states of disease. This is also the biggest shortcoming of this study type because by using prevalence rather than incidence it cannot be used to make a causal inference.

Application 
By contributing to reduction in exposure, occupational epidemiology helps reduce health risks among workers. Using occupational epidemiological methods can also have benefits for society at large. For example, recommendations for exposure limits to benzene developed by the Expert Panel on Air Quality Standards were based on occupational epidemiology.

Using meta-analysis, many occupational epidemiology studies can be synthesized in order to help set occupational exposure limits and make other kinds of policy decisions. This can also can be applied in health risk assessments, which is a method of predicting health risk based on hypothetical exposure conditions.

See also
 Alice Hamilton
 Occupational Hygiene

References

External links 
 Occupational Epidemiology and the National Institute for Occupational Safety and Health. https://www.cdc.gov/mmwr/preview/mmwrhtml/su6004a15.htm

Epidemiology
Occupational safety and health
Surveillance